Amos Weaver  was a sergeant in the United States Army and a Medal of Honor recipient for his actions in the Philippine–American War.

Medal of Honor citation
Rank and organization: Sergeant, Company F, 36th Infantry, U.S. Volunteers. Place and date: Between Calubus and Malalong, Philippine Islands, November 5, 1899. Entered service at: San Francisco, Calif. Born: June 13, 1869, Niles Township, Delaware County, Ind. Date of issue: March 15, 1902.

Citation:

Alone and unaided, charged a body of 15 insurgents, dislodging them, killing 4 and wounding several.

See also
List of Medal of Honor recipients
List of Philippine–American War Medal of Honor recipients

References

External links

1869 births
1937 deaths
United States Army Medal of Honor recipients
United States Army soldiers
American military personnel of the Philippine–American War
People from Delaware County, Indiana
Military personnel from Indiana
Philippine–American War recipients of the Medal of Honor